The Lone Ranger is an American animated television series that ran 26 episodes Saturday mornings on CBS from September 10, 1966, to September 6, 1969. The series was produced by Herb Klynn and Jules Engel of Format Films, Hollywood, and designed and made at the Halas and Batchelor Cartoon Film studios in London, England & Artransa Park Studios in Australia.

In 1980, Filmation produced another Lone Ranger cartoon series.

Overview
The adventures in this Lone Ranger series were similar in tone and nature to CBS' prime-time Weird Western, The Wild Wild West, in that some of the plots were bizarre and had elements of science fiction and steampunk technology included in the story. One of the Lone Ranger's archenemies in the animated series was a dwarf named Tiny Tom and his giant henchman named Goliath; an analogue to The Wild Wild West's Dr. Miguelito Loveless and his giant companion Voltaire. Other supervillain-style foes in the series included the Fly, the Frog People, the Black Widow, the Queen Bee, the Iron Giant, Mephisto, Mr. Happy, Mr. Midas, the Rainmaker and Shandarr the Puppetmaster.

Cast
Michael Rye — Lone Ranger
Shepard Menken — Tonto
Dick Beals — Tiny Tom 
Agnes Moorehead — The Black Widow
Hans Conried — Mephisto
Paul Winchell — The Rainmaker

Production

The Lone Ranger's voice was provided by Michael Rye {r.n. John Michael Riorden Billsbury}, and Shepard Menken provided that of Tonto. The narrator in the opening titles was Marvin Miller, whose narration ran:

Other guest voices were provided by Paul Winchell, Agnes Moorehead, and Hans Conried.

The animation was limited. But the backgrounds had a dark style, with blocks of color elided from the line, which visually set the show apart from many other cartoon TV series of the time. The distinct atmospheric music was composed by Vic Schoen, who also provided the powerful arrangement of Gioachino Rossini's William Tell Overture for the show's memorable opening sequence. Along with the Halas and Batchelor animators, the background department, led by Tom Bailey, Ted Petengel and designer Chris Miles, were responsible for setting the graphic style. The drawings were produced by chinagraph pencil on cell. Colored papers were cut or torn under or against the lines of the background, producing a dramatic and rich textural effect.

List of episodes

Home media
The 1960s animated cartoon TV series version of The Lone Ranger was not available on home media as of the middle of January 2017. This was partially explainable as a result of confusion over the ownership of the copyright to it. However, Universal Television, which had been partially responsible for the show's production in the sense of having commissioned Format Films and Halas and Batchelor Animation to work on it with the permission of Jack Wrather Productions, then owners of the Lone Ranger copyright, could be said to have a legitimate copyright-ownership claim.

References

External links

Lone Ranger Fanclub
 Description at Pazaz Entertainment

1966 American television series debuts
1969 American television series endings
American animated television spin-offs
American children's animated action television series
American children's animated adventure television series
Western (genre) animated television series
CBS original programming
1966
1960s Western (genre) television series
1960s American animated television series
Television series by Format Films
Television series by Halas and Batchelor